Alchornea ilicifolia, commonly known as the native holly, is a bush of eastern Australia. It grows in or on the edges of the drier rainforests, from Jamberoo, New South Wales to Atherton, Queensland.

Taxonomy
The botanist John Smith originally described this species as Caelebogyne ilicifolia in 1839, from three specimens collected by Allan Cunningham in 1829. The Swiss botanist Johann Müller gave it its current name in 1865. The generic name Alchornea honours the English botanist Stanesby Alchorne. Ilicifolia refers to the holly like leaves (Ilex).The leaves are food for the larvae of the Common Albatross butterfly.

Description 
A shrub or rarely a small tree up to 6 meters tall and with a stem diameter of 10 cm. The trunk is usually crooked, with pale grey smooth bark, with some pustules and lenticels. Small branches greenish or fawn in color, with paler lenticels.

Leaves holly-like in appearance, 2 to 8 cm long, 2 to 5 cm wide. Ovate or rhomboidal in shape with three or four teeth on each side of the leaf. Leaf tip and teeth sharp and pointed. Leaves stiff, hairless and pale on the underside. Leaf stalks around 3 mm long. Leaf venation evident on both leaf sides. Three or four lateral leaf veins nearly at right angles to the midrib, ending in a sharp point.

Flowers and fruit 
Greenish flowers appear in November, on racemes. Male and female flowers on separate plants. The fruit is a dark brown capsule about 6 mm in diameter, usually with three lobes. With one seed in each cell. Fruit ripe from September to November, but may also occur at other times of the year. Difficult to regenerate from seed, though cuttings strike well.

Uses 
An attractive garden shrub.

Excellent slow growing hedge.

References

 
 

Alchorneae
Flora of New South Wales
Flora of Queensland
Trees of Australia
Ornamental trees